KOME-FM (95.5 MHz) is a radio station licensed to serve the community of Tolar, Texas. The station is owned by LKCM Radio Group, and is fully simulcast with its sister station 106.5 KITT in Meridian, Texas. KOME and KITT air a classic hits music format. 

The station was assigned the call sign KSCG by the Federal Communications Commission on October 10, 2006. The station changed its call sign to KOME-FM on July 18, 2008.

References

External links
Official Website

OME-FM
Radio stations established in 2009
2009 establishments in Texas
Classic hits radio stations in the United States
Bosque County, Texas